Rockyview General Hospital (RGH) is a large hospital. It is located in the city of Calgary, Alberta, Canada, on the shores of the Glenmore Reservoir and is administered by Alberta Health Services and formerly by the Calgary Health Region.

The hospital contains over 650 beds and provides medical and surgical services to Calgary and Southern Alberta. The RGH is noted for its comprehensive urology department, and is becoming the leader in Canada for urological care. It includes a 24-hour emergency department, an intensive care unit (ICU), as well as day surgery units. It offers a Maternal Newborn Program, mental health and psychiatric services, as well as senior's health and ambulatory care. The Lions Eye Bank, which is a regional centre for recovery of donated eye tissue for corneal transplants, is located at RGH.

The building was designed by Culham Pedersen Valentine, and built at a cost of $90 million. Further expansion in 2004 added another 100 beds.

The hospital underwent expansion and upgrades, with two operating theatres added to the surgical suite, and vertical expansion of the Highwood Building. The construction included an additional 100 inpatient beds, as well as three stories added to the hospital's North Tower, and five stories to the south side of the hospital. These expansions were completed in 2008.

Clinics
The facility contains 19 clinics:

Breast Feeding
Bronchoscopy
Cast
Cystoscopy
Enterostomal Therapy
Emergency Cast
General Ante-partum
General Cardiology
Hand
Home Visit
Infectious Disease
Medical Geriatric
OBS Gyne
Ophthalmology
Orthopedic
Outreach
Pacemaker
Pain
Pre-op Assessment

Ambulatory care include Medicine, Respiratory, GI/GU, Surgery, Diabetes in Pregnancy, Pulmonary Respiratory Exercise Program, Lithotripsy, Pacemaker Clinic, Paediatric Clinic, Geriatric Outpatient Consultation and Geriatric Mental Health.

See also
Health care in Calgary
Health care in Canada
List of hospitals in Canada

References

External links
Rockyview General Hospital

Buildings and structures in Calgary
Hospitals in Calgary
Heliports in Canada
Certified airports in Alberta